Samurzakano (Samurzak'ano, Samurzaqano) is a historical region in southeastern Abkhazia, in western Georgia.  Populated by Samurzakanians.

History 

Samurzakano was established as a fief of one of the branches of the Chachba family in the early 18th century. It included the territory of the contemporary Gal district and part of Ochamchira district.

The Georgian Soviet Encyclopaedia wrote "in 1705 three brothers of the Abkhazian ruling family, surnamed Chachba (in Georgian Shervashidze) divided up their territory, one taking the north (from Gagra to the R. Kodor), the second the central Abzhywa region (from the Kodor to the R. Ghalidzga), and the third, Murzaqan, the southern part (from the Ghalidzga to the R. Ingur), and so this province, which was roughly equivalent to the modern Gal District, became known as Samurzaqano."

Gallery 
.

References 

Historical regions of Georgia (country)
History of Abkhazia
Regions of Abkhazia
Kartvelian studies